The Old Bank of America Building at 710 Main St. in Red Bluff, California, was built in 1925. It was designed by architect William H. Weeks. It has also been known as The Daily News. It was listed on the National Register of Historic Places in 1980.

Several banking entities had ownership of the building in succession, until it was sold in 1959 with explicit restriction that it could not be used as a bank for at least five years.  It stood vacant, instead, until in 1969 it became the home of the Red Bluff Daily News.

In 2016, the Red Bluff Daily News main office is located at 728 Main St.

References

Red Bluff, California
Bank of America legacy banks
Buildings and structures in Tehama County, California
Bank buildings on the National Register of Historic Places in California
Commercial buildings completed in 1925
Neoclassical architecture in California
National Register of Historic Places in Tehama County, California